Vojtěch Tomeček (born August 12, 1994) is a Czech professional ice hockey player. He is currently playing for HC Olomouc of the Czech Extraliga.

Tomeček made his Czech Extraliga debut playing with HC Karlovy Vary during the 2013–14 Czech Extraliga season.

References

External links

1994 births
Living people
Czech ice hockey right wingers
HC Dukla Jihlava players
HC Karlovy Vary players
HC Olomouc players
Piráti Chomutov players
Sportspeople from Karlovy Vary